Titan is the rural locality (a Posyolok) in Kirovsk municipality of Murmansk Oblast, Russia. The village is located beyond the Arctic circle, on the Kola Peninsula. Located at a height of 268 m above sea level.

References

Rural localities in Murmansk Oblast